Emil Keres (9 July 1925 – 1 April 2016) was a Hungarian actor and theatre director.

Selected filmography

Awards
 Kossuth Prize (1965)

References

External links
 

1925 births
2016 deaths
Hungarian male stage actors
Hungarian male film actors
20th-century Hungarian male actors
21st-century Hungarian male actors
People from Vas County